Leo John Steck (August 30, 1898 - June 19, 1950) was a bishop of the Catholic Church in the United States. He served as auxiliary bishop of the Diocese of Salt Lake City from 1948-1950.

Biography
Born in St. Louis, Missouri, Leo Steck studied for the priesthood at Kenrick Seminary and was ordained a priest on June 8, 1924 for the Archdiocese of St. Louis. He was engaged in pastoral work as a priest and served as the director of the Catholic Rural Life Conference.  On March 13, 1948 Pope Pius XII appointed him as the Titular Bishop of Ilium and Auxiliary Bishop of Salt Lake City.  He was consecrated a bishop by Archbishop Joseph Ritter of St. Louis on May 20, 1948. The principal co-consecrators were Bishops Mark Carroll of Wichita and Auxiliary Bishop John Cody of St. Louis.

Steck established the Newman Center at the University of Utah.  He also wrote a leaflet, A Foreign Mission Close to Home, that appealed for financial support for the Salt Lake diocese  The Mormons misunderstood its intent a considered it a call for the conversion of the members of the Church of Jesus Christ of Latter-day Saints. Salt Lake's bishop, Duane G. Hunt, had to reassure the Mormons of their true intent. Bishop Steck had health problems and when he was in his native Missouri suffered a stroke. He died at a St. Louis hospital on June 19, 1950 at the age of 51.

References

External links

1898 births
1950 deaths
Clergy from St. Louis
Kenrick–Glennon Seminary alumni
Roman Catholic Archdiocese of St. Louis
20th-century American Roman Catholic titular bishops
Religious leaders from Missouri
Roman Catholic Diocese of Salt Lake City